No. 607 (County of Durham) Squadron is an auxiliary squadron of the Royal Air Force. It was formed in 1930 as a bomber unit in the Auxiliary Air Force and changed in 1936 to the fighter role. It fought in that role during the Second World War in Europe and Asia. After the war, in 1946, the squadron reformed as a fighter unit.  Awarded the title Royal Auxiliary Air Force by King George in 1947, 607 Sqn was disbanded with all the other flying units of the RAuxAF on 10 March 1957. It reformed on 5 January 2015, as a General Service Support Squadron (GSS).

History

Formation and early years
No. 607 Squadron was formed on 17 March 1930 at the then new airfield of RAF Usworth, County Durham as a day bomber unit of the Auxiliary Air Force (AuxAF). They became operational in the summer of 1933, having received their first aircraft in December 1932, flying Westland Wapitis. First commanding officer was Walter Leslie Runciman (later the 2nd Viscount Runciman of Doxford). In September 1936 the squadron was told that it was to re-role to a fighter squadron and was re-equipped with Hawker Demons. In the run up to WW2, 607 received Gloster Gladiators, which arrived in December 1938.

Second World War

Having achieved their first success downing a DO 18 flying boat in the North Sea and still equipped with Gladiators, the squadron was deployed to France as part of the Air Component of the British Expeditionary Force in November 1939. During the Battle of France, the squadron operated from various locations, including Saint-Inglevert. In March 1940, the squadron was re-equipped with Hawker Hurricanes, just in time to effectively operate against the modern Luftwaffe aircraft during the Blitzkrieg. Following the British withdrawal, the squadron returned to the United Kingdom and served throughout the Battle of Britain, firstly in the air defence of the North East of England then on the South coast with 11Gp. In October 1941, the Squadron moved to RAF Manston and remained there undertaking anti shipping operations and cross channel fighter sweeps until 1942. During this period, 607 became the first unit to operate the Hurricane in the fighter bomber role and using their "Hurri-bombers" destroyed or damaged several enemy support vessels during the German capital ships "Channel dash!" on 12 February 1942.

During 1942, the Squadron was transported to India. There, it joined No. 166 Wing RAF on 25 May 1942. In September 1943, the Squadron's Hurricanes were replaced with Supermarine Spitfires. This change in machine, made the squadron the first unit in South East Asia Command to operate such aircraft. It re-equipped with the Spitfire Mk.VIII in March 1944, and flew these in support of XIV Army, including the Imphal and Kohima actions, until disbanding on 19 August 1945 at Mingaladon in Burma.

607 were one of the last units to finish operations in this theatre.

Post-war
On 10 May 1946, No. 607 Squadron reformed at RAF Ouston as a day fighter squadron of the Royal Auxiliary Air Force. After flying Spitfire F.14 and F.22s for five years, it converted to De Havilland Vampires. These were flown until February 1957 when, along with all the other flying units of the RAuxAF, it was disbanded on 10 March 1957.

Reformation
Re-formed 5 January 2015, the squadron is now a General Service Support Squadron (GSS) and operates from RAF Leeming in North Yorkshire. The squadron has an established strength of almost 120 staff and has won awards for its recruitment and retention abilities.

Aircraft operated

Squadron locations

Commanding officers

See also
 List of Royal Air Force aircraft squadrons

References

Notes

Bibliography

External links

 The Official RAF Website about 602 to 607 sqn. in the Battle of Britain
 The Official RAF Website about 607 sqn.
 rafweb.org Squadron histories for nos. 605–610 sqn. on RAF web
 Norav
 Official site of Squadron leader John Sample
 607 sqn in the Battle of Britain

607 Squadron
Fighter squadrons of the Royal Air Force in World War II
RAF squadrons involved in the Battle of Britain
Military units and formations established in 1930